Maurice Haskell Heins (19 November 1915, Boston – 4 June 2015) was an American mathematician, specializing in complex analysis and harmonic analysis.

Heins received his bachelor's degree in 1937, his master's degree in 1939, and his Ph.D. in 1940, under Joseph L. Walsh, from Harvard University with thesis Extremal Problems for Functions Analytic and Single-Valued in a Doubly-Connected Region. He then worked on topological methods from 1940 to 1942 as Marston Morse's assistant at the Institute for Advanced Study in Princeton. Heins was from 1942 to 1944 an assistant professor at the Illinois Institute of Technology and in 1944–1945 an applied mathematician at the Chief Ordnance Office of the U.S. Army.  In 1945 he became an assistant professor at Brown University, where he eventually became a full professor. He was a full professor at the University of Illinois at Urbana-Champaign from 1958 to 1974. From 1974 to 1986 he was a Distinguished Professor at the University of Maryland. He was the supervisor for 19 Ph.D. theses. His doctoral students include Bernard Epstein and Jang-Mei Wu.

In the academic year 1952–1953 Heins was a Fulbright Fellow at the Sorbonne and in 1979 a visiting professor at the University of Paris VI. In the academic year 1963–1964 he was a visiting professor at the University of California, Berkeley.

Heins was elected a Fellow of the American Association for the Advancement of Science, a Fellow of the American Academy of Arts and Sciences in 1956, and a Fellow of the American Mathematical Society in 2012. He was an Invited Speaker at the ICM in 1958 in Edinburgh.

In 1940 he married Hadassah Wagman (bachelor's degree 1939 Radcliffe). Upon his death he was survived by his widow, two children, four grandchildren, and several great-grandchildren. Albert Edward Heins, one of Maurice Heins's two brothers, was also a prominent mathematician.

Selected publications

Articles

Books
 with R. Nevanlinna and others: Analytic Functions (Conference on Analytic Functions held in 1957 at the Institute for Advanced Study, Princeton, N.J.), Princeton University Press 1960
Contents: On differentiable mappings, by R. Nevanlinna.--Analysis in non-compact complex spaces, by H. Behnke and H. Grauert.--The complex analytic structure of the space of closed Riemann surfaces, by L.V. Ahlfors.--Some remarks on perturbation of structure, by D.C. Spencer.--Quasiconformal mappings and Teichmüller's theorem, by L. Bers.--On compact analytic surfaces, by K. Kodaira.--The conformal mapping of Riemann surfaces, by M. Heins.--On certain coefficients of univalent functions, by J.A. Jenkins. 
 Selected Topics in the Classical Theory of Functions of a Complex Variable, Holt, Rinehart and Winston 1962; Dover reprint, 2105
 Complex Function Theory, Academic Press 1968
 Hardy Classes on Riemann Surfaces, Springer Verlag 1969

References

External links
 photo with the widow Louise Morse at Marston Morse's funeral 1977, IAS Collection

1915 births
2015 deaths
Boston Latin School alumni
Harvard University alumni
Brown University faculty
University of Illinois Urbana-Champaign faculty
University of Maryland, College Park faculty
20th-century American mathematicians
Fellows of the American Academy of Arts and Sciences
Fellows of the American Association for the Advancement of Science
Fellows of the American Mathematical Society